In written English usage, a comma splice or comma fault is the use of a comma to join two independent clauses. For example:

The comma splice is sometimes used in literary writing to convey a particular mood of informality. In the United States it is usually considered an error in English writing style. Some authorities on English usage consider comma splices appropriate in limited situations, such as informal writing or with short similar phrases.

Overview 
Comma splices are rare in most published writing but are common among inexperienced writers of English.

The original 1918 edition of The Elements of Style by William Strunk Jr. advises using a semicolon, not a comma, to join two grammatically complete clauses, except when the clauses are "very short" and "similar in form", for example:

Comma splices are similar to run-on sentences, which join two independent clauses without any punctuation and without a coordinating conjunction such as and, but for, etc. Sometimes the two types of sentences are treated differently based on the presence or absence of a comma, but most writers consider the comma splice as a special type of run-on sentence. According to Garner's Modern English Usage: 

Comma splices often arise when writers use conjunctive adverbs (such as furthermore, however, or moreover) to separate two independent clauses instead of using a coordinating conjunction.

In literature 
Comma splices are also occasionally used in fiction, poetry, and other forms of literature to convey a particular mood or informal style. Some authors use commas to separate short clauses only. The comma splice is more commonly found in works from the 18th and 19th century, when written prose mimicked speech more closely.

Fowler's Modern English Usage describes the use of the comma splice by the authors Elizabeth Jolley and Iris Murdoch:

Journalist Oliver Kamm writes of novelist Jane Austen's use of the comma splice, "Tastes in punctuation are not constant. It makes no sense to accuse Jane Austen of incorrect use of the comma, as no one would have levelled this charge against her at the time. Her conventions of usage were not ours."

The author and journalist Lynne Truss writes in Eats, Shoots & Leaves that "so many highly respected writers observe the splice comma that a rather unfair rule emerges on this one: only do it if you're famous." Citing Samuel Beckett, E. M. Forster, and Somerset Maugham, she says: "Done knowingly by an established writer, the comma splice is effective, poetic, dashing. Done equally knowingly by people who are not published writers, it can look weak or presumptuous. Done ignorantly by ignorant people, it is awful."

Notes

References

Further reading

External links 
 The Elements of Style: full text of Strunk's 1918 edition

English grammar
Punctuation